Sir Basil Keith (1734 – 15 November 1777) was a British naval officer and Governor of Jamaica.

He was born the second son of diplomat Robert Murray Keith and the younger brother of Lieutenant-General Robert Keith.

He was knighted on 10 June 1772 and appointed Governor of Jamaica in February 1773, taking up his post in January 1774.

He died in Jamaica in 1777 and a large marble monument by sculptor Joseph Wilton was erected in his honour in 1780 at St Catherine's Parish Church (St Jago de la Vega church) in the old capital of Spanish Town.

References

Date of birth unknown
1777 deaths
Royal Navy officers
Governors of Jamaica
Knights Bachelor